Tjvjik, tzhvzhik  or dzhvzhig is an Armenian dish which is mainly based on liver (lamb, beef, pork or chicken). In addition to liver it can include any other offal. It is considered an easy dish to prepare.

Etymology 

From  ("to make hissing sounds") +‎ -իկ (diminutive suffix), probably because of the sound of frying.

Preparation and ingredients 
After unwrapping the liver, the bile is removed, and the lungs are washed. The kidneys are also unwrapped and cut in half. The esophagus is turned inside out and well-washed. Prepared offal and tail fat are washed, cut into equal pieces, put in a pan and fried until half-cooked. Then hopped onion is added, along with tomato purée (optional), salt, and pepper. The pan should be covered with a lid to cook tjvjik until tender. The dish is usually served with parsley.

In popular culture 
In the story of the writer Atrpet (Sarkis Mubaiyajyan), the plot revolves around a piece of liver that a rich man gives to a poor man. The story was screened in 1961 as a short film by Arman Manaryan at the Armenfilm studio and became the first ever film in the Western Armenian language.

According to the book Armenian Food: Fact, Fiction & Folklore, the expression "don't make a story about tzhvzhik" became part of Armenian colloquial language. It's used when there is too much curiosity or a bit too much talk about a particular dish and how tasty it is.

In 2006, DJ Serjo, one of the most notable Armenian house music producers, released his first album named Tjvjik.

See also 
 Dolma
 Hash
 Arnavut ciğeri
 Jerusalem mixed grill

Bibliography

References

Armenian cuisine
Caucasian cuisine
Liver (food)
Fried foods
Offal